The Roman Catholic Diocese of Girardota is a diocese located in the city of Girardota in the Ecclesiastical province of Medellín in Colombia.

History
 18 June 1988: Established as Diocese of Girardota from Metropolitan Archdiocese of Medellín

Ordinaries
Oscar Angel Bernal † (18 Jun 1988 – 4 Jul 1996 Died)
Héctor Ignacio Salah Zuleta (21 Feb 1998 – 13 May 2005) Appointed, Bishop of Riohacha
Óscar González Villa (24 Apr 2006 – 10 Jun 2006) Resigned before episcopal ordination
Gonzalo Restrepo Restrepo (11 Jul 2006 – 16 Jul 2009) Appointed, Coadjutor Archbishop of Manizales
Guillermo Orozco Montoya (2 Feb 2010 – present)

See also
Roman Catholicism in Colombia

Sources

External links
 Catholic Hierarchy
 GCatholic.org

Roman Catholic dioceses in Colombia
Roman Catholic Ecclesiastical Province of Medellín
Christian organizations established in 1988
Roman Catholic dioceses and prelatures established in the 20th century